Hélder Jorge Leal Rodrigues Barbosa (born 25 May 1987) is a Portuguese professional footballer who plays for Varzim S.C. as a left winger.

He amassed Primeira Liga totals of 148 matches and 19 goals, mainly for Braga (three seasons) and Académica (two). He also played for teams in Spain, Greece, the United Arab Emirates and Turkey.

All youth levels comprised, Barbosa won 77 caps for Portugal. He made his senior debut in 2012.

Club career

Porto
Barbosa was born in Paredes, Porto District. A product of FC Porto's youth academy, he made his Primeira Liga debut in the last day of the 2005–06 season, with the northerners already crowned champions: he played the second half of a 1–1 away derby against Boavista FC, and was sent off in the last minute.

From 2006 to 2008, Barbosa was loaned to fellow league club Académica de Coimbra, but was recalled by Porto in mid-January 2008 to make up for the loss of Tarik Sektioui, who was selected by Morocco for the Africa Cup of Nations. He served another loan in 2008–09 to lowly newcomers C.D. Trofense, notably scoring against S.L. Benfica in an historic 2–0 home win. He only missed two league games during the season, but could not help prevent immediate relegation.

Barbosa was again loaned for the following campaign, now to Vitória de Setúbal. He scored his first goal for the Sadinos on 31 August 2009, but in a 8–1 loss at Benfica.

Braga
On 2 July 2010, after helping Setúbal avoid top-flight relegation, Barbosa was released by Porto, signing a three-year contract with S.C. Braga. Rarely used in the first months, he began gaining more playing time after the January 2011 departure of Matheus, who left for a team in Ukraine, and contributed four league goals in an eventual fourth-place finish.

In less than one month, starting on 25 August 2011, Barbosa scored in four consecutive games for Braga, including one goal in a 3–1 home victory over Gil Vicente F.C. and two at Birmingham City in the group stage of the UEFA Europa League, in another 3–1 win. The following 14 February, he was sent off for a second bookable offence in the 0–2 home loss to Beşiktaş J.K. for the Europa League round-of-32, after diving in the penalty area.

Barbosa was loaned to La Liga side UD Almería on 28 August 2013. He netted his first goal for the Andalusians on 11 January 2014, but in a 6–1 away defeat against Athletic Bilbao.

AEK Athens
On 31 July 2014, Barbosa signed a three-year deal with AEK Athens F.C. on a free transfer. He scored five goals in 26 appearances in his debut season, helping the club return to the Super League Greece after a two-year absence.

Later years
On 24 August 2016, Barbosa joined Al-Wasl F.C. from the UAE Arabian Gulf League on a three-year contract for a transfer fee of €750.000, earning €600.000 per year. The following summer, he moved to the Süper Lig with Akhisarspor after agreeing to a two-year deal. On 10 May 2018, both he and countryman Miguel Lopes scored as the latter club beat Fenerbahçe S.K. 3–2 in the final of the Turkish Cup, for its first-ever major trophy.

Barbosa continued in Turkey in the 2019–20 season, signing with Hatayspor of the TFF First League. The 33-year-old returned to the Greek top tier on 14 January 2021, on a one-and-a-half-year contract at Panetolikos FC.

International career
Barbosa made his debut for Portugal on 14 November 2012 in a friendly with Gabon, playing the last 11 minutes of the 2–2 draw in Libreville after coming on as a substitute for Braga teammate Custódio.

Career statistics

Club

Honours
Porto
Primeira Liga: 2005–06, 2007–08

Braga
Taça da Liga: 2012–13

AEK Athens
Greek Football Cup: 2015–16
Football League Greece: 2014–15 (South Group)

Akhisarspor
Turkish Cup: 2017–18
Turkish Super Cup: 2018

References

External links

1987 births
Living people
People from Paredes, Portugal
Sportspeople from Porto District
Portuguese footballers
Association football wingers
Primeira Liga players
Segunda Divisão players
FC Porto B players
FC Porto players
Associação Académica de Coimbra – O.A.F. players
C.D. Trofense players
Vitória F.C. players
S.C. Braga players
Varzim S.C. players
La Liga players
UD Almería players
Super League Greece players
Football League (Greece) players
AEK Athens F.C. players
Panetolikos F.C. players
UAE Pro League players
Al-Wasl F.C. players
Süper Lig players
TFF First League players
Akhisarspor footballers
Hatayspor footballers
Portugal youth international footballers
Portugal under-21 international footballers
Portugal international footballers
Portuguese expatriate footballers
Expatriate footballers in Spain
Expatriate footballers in Greece
Expatriate footballers in the United Arab Emirates
Expatriate footballers in Turkey
Portuguese expatriate sportspeople in Spain
Portuguese expatriate sportspeople in Greece
Portuguese expatriate sportspeople in the United Arab Emirates
Portuguese expatriate sportspeople in Turkey